Chingachgook is a character in James Fenimore Cooper novels.

Chingachgook may also refer to:

 USS Chingachgook (SP-35), a former US Navy ship